Princess Stéphanie may refer to:

 Princess Stéphanie of Monaco (born 1965), youngest child of Rainier III, Prince of Monaco, and American actress Grace Kelly
 Princess Stéphanie of Belgium (1864–1945), daughter of Léopold II, King of the Belgians, and wife of Crown Prince Rudolf of Austria
 Princess Stéphanie of Hohenzollern-Sigmaringen (1837–1859), daughter of Karl Anton, Prince of Hohenzollern, and wife of Pedro V, King of Portugal
 Princess Stéphanie of France (1789–1860), adopted daughter of Napoléon I, Emperor of the French, and wife of Karl, Grand Duke of Baden
Princess Stephanie of Windisch-Graetz (b 1909 - 2005), daughter of Prince Otto Weriand of Windisch-Grätz
Stéphanie, Hereditary Grand Duchess of Luxembourg (born 1984) Belgian noble, wife of Guillaume, Hereditary Grand Duke of Luxembourg

See also
Princess Stephanie's astrapia (Astrapia stephaniae), a type of bird